Zookeeper is a 2011 American fantasy comedy film directed by Frank Coraci, with a screenplay by Nick Bakay, Rock Reuben, Kevin James, Jay Scherick, and David Ronn, from a story by Scherick and Ronn, and produced by  Todd Garner, James, Adam Sandler, Jack Giarraputo, and Walt Becker. The film stars James in the title role, with Rosario Dawson, Leslie Bibb, Ken Jeong, Donnie Wahlberg, Joe Rogan, Nat Faxon, and Tom Woodruff Jr., alongside the voices of Cher, Nick Nolte, Sandler, Sylvester Stallone, Judd Apatow, Jim Breuer, Jon Favreau, Faizon Love, Richie Minervini, Maya Rudolph, and Bas Rutten. It is about an unlucky zookeeper who turns to the talking animals at his zoo to help him find love.

Filming began in Boston on August 17, 2009. It was the first MGM film to be co-produced with Happy Madison (as well as their first production to be released after the company had filed for bankruptcy the year prior), though the film, like a majority of the Happy Madison output, was distributed by Columbia Pictures. Zookeeper was released in the United States on July 8, 2011. It received mostly negative reviews from critics and earned $169.8 million on an $80 million budget.

Plot
In 2005, zookeeper Griffin Keyes proposes to his girlfriend Stephanie, but is turned down, citing his career as a zookeeper as the reason, breaking his heart.

Five years later in 2010, Griffin is now head zookeeper at the Franklin Park Zoo, caring deeply for the animals. That night, Griffin holds an engagement party there for his brother Dave, but freaks out when he discovers that Stephanie was invited. Dave suggests that Griffin work with him at his car dealership to get Stephanie back, so Griffin considers doing it.

The animals hold a meeting that evening as they feel that Griffin is the best zookeeper, so they decide to find some way to help him win back Stephanie. Jerome the brown bear suggests that they teach Griffin their mating techniques, but Joe the lion protests, reminding them that it's against the animal code to talk to humans. Donald the monkey suggests that they make Griffin look like a hero when Stephanie is at the zoo tomorrow.

The next day, Donald lets Joe out, who confronts Stephanie and Dave's fiancée Robin. Griffin ruins the animals' plan by failing to jump into the lion enclosure, and instead the vet Kate, captures Joe. When he climbs out of the enclosure, Joe accidentally yells at Griffin in frustration, causing Griffin to believe that he has gone mad. That night, all the animals break the code of silence and tell Griffin that they will teach him to win back Stephanie. He learns their different mating rituals, ending up humiliating himself at a party in front of the other zookeepers and the guests.

Griffin then has a talk with Bernie, a forlorn Western lowland gorilla who has spent years in a deep enclosure after allegedly attacking a zookeeper named Shane. Bernie tells Griffin that Shane fell when he was abusing him, but lied, saying that Bernie attacked him. This caused Bernie to mistrust humans.

Griffin discovers that Stephanie is dating another ex-boyfriend, a bully named Gale. Joe's mate Janet tells Griffin that the best way to attract a female is to be seen with another female, so Griffin asks Kate to go with him to Dave and Robin's wedding.

Griffin successfully grabs Stephanie's attention by first showing off with Kate, then standing up to Gale. Stephanie asks him out to dinner and after they go to a fashion show. Stephanie convinces Griffin to quit his job and he accepts Dave's job offer. This upsets Kate, and also Bernie, who tells him that Griffin quitting proves that he can't trust humans. As he leaves, Griffin warns Shane not to hurt Bernie. Kate decides to leave the zoo and accepts a job in Nairobi.

Griffin becomes a star employee at the car dealership, but finds he misses working at the zoo. When Stephanie proposes to him in the midst of his success, he refuses without hesitation, dumping her as he realizes that she doesn't truly love or accept him as an individual and that their relationship was all conditional to her. He then goes to the zoo, apologizing to Bernie who he sees has been beaten by Shane. The animals tell him that Kate is heading to the airport, so Griffin heads out to stop her; stopping at Shane's house first to attack him for hurting Bernie. Then, with Bernie's help, Griffin manages to catch Kate on the bridge and confess his love for her. The two kiss.

Six months later, Griffin and Kate get married and are back at the zoo and Bernie is now living in a new enclosure where he gets a great view of the city.

Cast

Animals

Animal voices
 Nick Nolte as Bernie, a Western lowland gorilla
 Sylvester Stallone as Joe, an African lion
 Adam Sandler as Donald, a tufted capuchin
 Judd Apatow as Barry, an Indian elephant
 Cher as Janet, a lioness and Joe's mate 
 Jon Favreau as Jerome, a brown bear
 Faizon Love as Bruce, a Kodiak bear
 Maya Rudolph as Mollie, a reticulated giraffe
 Bas Rutten as Sebastian, a wolf
 Don Rickles as Jim, an American bullfrog; This was the final film that Rickles finished before his death on April 6th, 2017.
 Jim Breuer as Spike, a crow
 Richie Minervini as Elmo, an ostrich

Production

Development 
On April 22, 2008, it was announced that Metro-Goldwyn-Mayer had purchased the script of the film, for $2 million, against DreamWorks Pictures and Walt Disney Pictures, and with Walt Becker attached to direct and produce.

Filming and giraffe's death 
Filming began in Boston on August 17, 2009, aiming for a release in October 2010, which was then released on July 8, 2011. Filming ended on October 30, 2009.

Tweet, the giraffe who rose to fame as a star in the classic Toys "R" Us commercials (by being cast as Geoffrey, the company's official mascot) and who appeared alongside Jim Carrey in the film Ace Ventura: Pet Detective, died after filming Zookeeper at the Franklin Park Zoo. During the filming  18-year-old giraffe Tweet died after  eating pieces of blue tarp that covered his cage. He was being held in a 20-by-20 foot stall and collapsed in his pen, causing PETA to come down hard on the filmmakers and stage protests at the film's premiere.

The two bears in this live action film were performed by Heber City, Utah's Wasatch Rocky Mountain Wildlife veteran Grizzly actors Bart the Bear 2 and Honey Bump.

Tai the elephant was featured in a video, reportedly filmed in 2005 and released in 2011 by Animal Defenders International (ADI), which showed him being abused by its trainers. A campaign to boycott the movie was formed since the outbreak of the news. ADI has also contacted the American Humane Association, urging them to re-evaluate how they assess the use of animals in films and the statements being made which effectively endorse the use of performing animals. Animal rights advocates PETA also urged the public to boycott the film.

Music

Soundtrack
 "I'll Supply the Love" – Performed by Toto
 "Carry On Wayward Son" – Performed by Kansas
 "Anything for You" – Performed by The Axis
 "Smokin'" – Performed by Boston
 "Low" – Performed by Flo Rida featuring T-Pain
 "Unbelievable" – Performed by EMF
 "Two Out of Three Ain't Bad" – Performed by Meat Loaf
 "Kickstart My Heart" – Performed by Mötley Crüe
 "Boogie Wonderland" – Performed by Earth, Wind & Fire
 "You're the First, the Last, My Everything" – Performed by Barry White
 "Bebop Blues" – Performed by Peter Blair Jazz Quartet
 "Easy" – Performed by Commodores
 "Kiss You All Over" – Performed by Exile
 "Ball of Confusion (That's What the World Is Today)" – Performed by Love and Rockets
 "(Shake, Shake, Shake) Shake Your Booty" – Performed by KC & The Sunshine Band
 "So Much Class" – Performed by Doctor Jay featuring J. Sabin
 "In the Car Crash" – Performed by Swayzak
 "Yoga Music" – Written and Performed by Ana Brett, Ravi Singh and Tom Carden
 "Cum On Feel the Noize" – Performed by Quiet Riot
 "More Than a Feeling" – Performed by Boston

Release

Theatrical
Around 50 people came to the film's premiere at the Regency Village Theatre in Westwood, Los Angeles, California to protest against the filmmakers for their alleged animal abuse. Frank Coraci claimed that the animals were not harmed during production. In an interview, Coraci stated, "... We worked with people who love their animals and [the American] Humane Association was there to ensure that they were being treated correctly. We didn’t do anything that we shouldn’t do. We treated the animals with love and respect."

Home media
The film was released on DVD and Blu-Ray on October 11, 2011.

Reception

Box office
Zookeeper made its debut in 3,482 theaters in the United States and Canada. It grossed $7.4 million on its opening day and $20.1 million on its opening weekend, ranking it #3 for the weekend behind holdover Transformers: Dark of the Moon and newcomer Horrible Bosses.
The film earned a worldwide total of $169,852,759.

Critical response
On Rotten Tomatoes, the film has an approval rating of 14% based on reviews from 133 critics and an average rating of 3.60/10. The site's critical consensus reads, "Zookeeper smothers Kevin James's [sic] with a sodden script and a surfeit of jokes inappropriate for the young viewers who would be intrigued by its juvenile storyline." On Metacritic, the film has a score of 30 out of 100 based on 29 critics, indicating "generally unfavorable reviews". Audiences polled by CinemaScore gave the film an average grade of "B+" on an A+ to F scale.

Brian Lowry of Variety called it "a marketing pitch in search of a movie" and a "punishingly flat effort that offers barely enough comedy to populate a three-minute trailer." Todd McCarthy of The Hollywood Reporter said "it's dreadful in every respect" and called it an "archly mirthless comedy". Despite his criticism he offers some small praise: "Although one would never have expected to find her in a film like this, Dawson, by dint of enthusiasm, is the only actor who rises above the material with her dignity intact." Ignatiy Vishnevetsky, who co-hosts the film review series Ebert Presents: At the Movies, said that "even though the movie looks hilarious from the trailer, it is only hilarious if you enjoy seeing Kevin James fall down a lot". He gave the film a "thumbs down," as did Christy Lemire, the other co-host of the series. In May 2011, RedLetterMedia (creators of the Mr. Plinkett reviews) did an episode of the show Half in the Bag reviewing the film's first trailer. The hosts sarcastically praised the trailer as if they thought it was a fake, well crafted parody of a tired subset of the comedy genre, at one point noting "All they were missing was a wise cracking sidekick for Kevin James, played by a rapper."

Roger Ebert of the Chicago Sun-Times gave the film three out of four, stating, "Look, a great movie this is not. A pleasant summer entertainment it is. I think it can play for all ages in a family audience... and besides, I'm getting a teensy bit exhausted by cute little animated animals. The creatures in this zoo all have the excellent taste to be in 2D." Sean O'Connell of The Washington Post wrote: "Pratfalls and agonizing tumbles appear to be James's business, and man, business is booming."

Accolades

Mary Pols of Time named it one of the Top 10 Worst Movies of 2011. British newspaper The Telegraph named Zookeeper one of the ten worst films of 2011, saying "Portly Kevin James is the hero of this "comedy", which boasts five screenwriters and not a single amusing moment."

References

External links

 
 
 
 

2011 films
2011 romantic comedy films
2010s English-language films
American romantic comedy films
Films set in zoos
Metro-Goldwyn-Mayer films
American children's comedy films
2010s children's comedy films
Films directed by Frank Coraci
Films shot in Boston
Films shot in Massachusetts
Happy Madison Productions films
Columbia Pictures films
Films about animals
Films produced by Adam Sandler
Films set in Boston
Films scored by Rupert Gregson-Williams
Films with screenplays by Kevin James
Animal cruelty incidents in film
2010s American films